The Glenn Hoddle Academy (GHA) was established in 2008, by former England international footballer Glenn Hoddle. Hoddle set the academy up in the memory of his brother, Carl, a former Tottenham Hotspur player who died aged 40.

The academy coaching staff is made up of Glenn Hoddle and fellow former footballers Graham Rix, Nigel Spackman, Dave Beasant and John Gorman.

Objectives

The main objective of the academy is to get former Premier League and Football League Championship scholars back into professional football after being released by their various clubs.

Glenn Hoddle came up with the idea of a football academy a long time before it actually opened. He had the idea for his academy while managing in the early 1990s.

The academy is financed by Hero Global Football Fund but its eventual aim is to make a profit by selling players through third-party ownership, signing sponsorship deals and offering coaching for other organisations, to become self-sustainable. Sell-on clauses will eventually make the academy pay, though it is yet to turn a profit.

In January 2009, the first signs that Hoddle's commitment was paying off came when former Fulham youngster Lino Goncalves was invited on a two-week trial with Championship club Ipswich Town. Chris Fagan was signed by Lincoln City, but only to be released again. James Dayton signed a 3-year contract with Kilmarnock. Another one of the players in Ikechi Anya signed a deal till the end of the season with Northampton Town, already playing an important role in the club's survival having already scored. He went on to play internationally for Scotland, and is currently contracted to Championship club Derby County.

The academy's ultimate goal remains getting players at a La Liga team or a Premier League team playing regularly for them. The first player from the academy to achieve this was Sam Clucas, a regular in the Championship with Hull City in 2015/16 during their promotion year and who has started in the first team in the Premier League during the 2016/17 season.

Overview

Ever since Hoddle started work on his plan for the academy, he has had offers from 60 countries asking him to set up similar academies. The Glenn Hoddle Academy have played friendly matches against many teams, including a Real Madrid XI team and Chelsea reserves. In 2008, up to 40 selected players were invited to join the academy after being released by professional clubs or having been identified by scouts.

By 2010, the academy has had more than 2,000 applications via their website and, since the academy opened, almost 600 have had trials.

Jerez Industrial

Many of the academy players were on the books of Spanish fourth division side Jerez Industrial CF during the 2009–10 and 2010–11 season.

In summer 2010, the academy saved the club from financial extinction by signing a five-year deal to manage the football side of the operation.  Eight players joined on loan for the second half of the 2009/10 season, six English players and also two Irish players. The academy stepped in to save Jerez from bankruptcy. In their final pre-season friendly against Xerez B, eight of the starting 11 were English or Irish. Jerez won the match 2–0.

With the players owed wages and the club fighting for its survival before Hoddle assumed control of the football side of operations, a loan of around £160,000 was made so that the club could pay off debts and continue trading.

Hoddle does not sit on the bench during games, acting as a director of football while his coaches, Graham Rix, Nigel Spackman and Dave Beasant, rotate match day duties two games at a time, working alongside Enrique Caballero. Hoddle does not hold a position at the club and will have an overseeing role.

In March 2011, the academy terminated the agreement with Jerez Industrial due to the club's failure to repay the loans it owed to the academy.

The Facility
The players stay in luxury villas on the grounds and they are given free accommodation, meals and spending money. Each player is said to cost the academy £50,000 a year.

Players

Ikechi Anya – signed by Celta Vigo B, now at Derby County and the Scotland National Football Team.
Reis Ashraf – signed by Leamington; plays for Pakistan national football team.
Harrison Bayley – signed by Onisolos.
Ryan Burge – signed by Port Vale, now retired.
David Cowley – signed by Recreativo de Huelva, before joining Harlow Town in August 2010.
Sam Clucas - signed for Hereford United and (via Mansfield Town and Chesterfield) is now playing for Stoke City.
James Dayton – signed by Kilmarnock in August 2010, now at Dulwich Hamlet.
Chris Fagan – signed by Lincoln City before signing for Bohemian F.C. in February 2011.
Alex Fisher - signed by Mansfield Town and now playing for Exeter City F.C. in the  League Two.
James Folkes – signed by Eastleigh in 2010 but has since been released.currently with Ebbsleet United as at Aug 2012.
Lino Goncalves – signed by Recreativo de Huelva.
Jordan Hugill – signed by Port Vale, now at West Ham United.
Billy Lumley – signed by Eastleigh in 2010.
Loren Maxwell – signed by Forest Green Rovers.
Adriano Moke – signed by York City in June 2011 .
Luke Morgan
Andy Owens – signed by Altrincham, now at AFC Telford United.
Chris Riley – signed by Cheshunt via Ebbsfleet United and Stansted.
Callum Morris – signed by Hayes,now at Ross County F.C.
Michael Scot
Daniel Spence – signed by Mansfield Town until the end of the 2010–11 season.
Emmanuel Udoji – signed by Ebbsfleet United via Stafford Rangers and Aveley.
Curtley Williams – signed by Lowestoft Town, now at Luton Town.
Tom Webb – signed by Halstead Town via Harlow Town.
Ben Williamson – signed by Port Vale.
Mickey Demetriou – signed by Eastbourne, now at Newport County

References

Football academies in England
2008 establishments in England